Milovan Vitezović (Serbian Cyrillic: Милован Витезовић; 11  September 1944 – 22 March 2022) was a Serbian writer, professor and screenwriter. He wrote poems, novels, essays, prose literature for children, reviews, aphorisms, movies and TV scripts. He published more than forty books and was represented in over fifty various anthologies.

His aphorisms were published in a series of European newspapers, such as the Hamburg Stern and Moscow's Sunday Times, and translated into Greek, Romanian, Hebrew, Swedish and Italian. Vitezović was one of the few Serbian and Yugoslav contemporary writers, whose books were banned and even burned in its first edition – the collection of aphorisms Srce me je otkucalo. His satirical texts were often published in the Serbian magazine Jež (Hedgehog).

He is the author of numerous television dramas and series, texts for theatrical performances and film scripts.

Biography 
Vitezović was born in Vitezovići at Kosjerić on 11 September 1944. He was educated in Tubić, Kosjerić, Užice and Belgrade, where he graduated from the University of Belgrade Faculty of Philology, department of general literature, and Faculty of Dramatic Arts, department of movies and TV scripts.

He was editor of operating in Književne novine (Literary Newspaper). In the youth magazine Susret omladine (Youth Meeting), he worked as an editor for literature until 1969, and since then as the editor of the journal Čivija (Pins). He was the editor of a feature series on RTS from 1977 to 1991, when he became the editor-in-chief of the RTS Arts and Entertainment Program. He was a member of the Association of Writers of Serbia (and its president from 2018) and the Serbian PEN Center and he also spoke and wrote for Nacionalna revija (National Review), a magazine on the national heritage of Serbia. In 2001, he became an associate professor at the Academy of Arts, Belgrade.

Literary work 
As narrator, the flow of actions leads insensibly, spontaneous and full of humor a custom situation, characterized by the developed part of fabulom anecdotal narration, fully describing atmosphere time on any deals. The range of his work is very wide, from historical figures and events, through the fictional characters of our time, to youth readings that represent chronicle youth, all of us. In his works not only provide insight into the life and world figures, but pictures of different areas, giving a general picture of space and time.

His works can be found in school curricula along with German high school textbooks. As guest editor of the Department of Textbooks and Teaching Aids, capital items in the edition edited by the selected pieces of Bogdan Popović, Jovan Skerlić, Milan Kašanin and Stojan Novaković.

Selected novels 
 Professor Kosta Vujić's Hat
 Barking at the Stars
 Milena from Knez Mihailova
 Sveta ljubav
 Hajduk Veljko Petrović
 The European Prince Miloš
 The Socks of King Peter

Aphorisms 
 Man, get angry,
 The heart beat me

TV dramas and series 
 Where The Yellow Lemon Blooms
 Kingdom of Serbia
 The Principality of Serbia
 Dimitrije Tucović
 Vuk Karadžić
 Then Lola invents slogans
 Student Age
 Snohvatice I-II

Film scripts 
 Extramarital Planner
 Branislav Nušić
 Lotus, life, death, Filip Filipovic
 Barking at the Stars
 King Peter of Serbia, co-writer

Awards 
He received numerous awards of which the most important: Zmaj Children Games (1978) Great Charter Bazjaške in Bucharest in 2005, Kočića Award (2005) - Republika Srpska, Golden Gašino pen (2006), Public Voice Award Meša Selimović the second place (2000).

He was a candidate for the Anthology of the world's best satirist, which was published in the United States 2007.

The Novi Sad June 2007, went to his honor to receive Zmajev poetic rod and open Zmaj Children Games, the largest festival of children's creativity in Europe.

Adaptation of his novel Barking at the Stars won the prestigious award domestic Golden Arena Novi Sad and the award in Herceg Novi.

He was awarded the Sretenje Order by the Republic of Serbia.

References

External links 

 
 Books by Milovan Vitezović

1944 births
2022 deaths
People from Kosjerić
Serbian writers
Serbian speculative fiction writers
Serbian screenwriters
Male screenwriters
Serbian dramatists and playwrights
Serbian male poets
Aphorists
Recipients of the Order of St. Sava
Members of the Academy of Sciences and Arts of the Republika Srpska
University of Arts in Belgrade alumni
University of Belgrade Faculty of Philology alumni
University of Belgrade Faculty of Dramatic Arts alumni